<noinclude>

University Hospitals Cleveland Medical Center (UH Cleveland Medical Center) is a large not-for-profit academic medical complex in Cleveland, Ohio, United States. University Hospitals Cleveland Medical Center is an affiliate hospital of Case Western Reserve University.

UH Cleveland Medical Center is the main campus of the University Hospitals Health System. With 150 locations throughout the Cleveland metropolitan area, the University Hospitals Health System encompasses hospitals, outpatient centers, and primary care physicians.

UH Cleveland Medical Center is home to world-class clinical and research centers, including cancer care, pediatrics, women's health, orthopedics, spine, radiology, radiation oncology, neurosurgery, neuroscience, psychiatry, cardiology, cardiovascular surgery, organ transplantation, and human genetics.

Locations
The main campus of the University Hospitals system is centered on the UH Cleveland Medical Center and is located in the University Circle neighborhood of Cleveland, neighboring both Case Western Reserve University and the Cleveland Clinic. The UH Cleveland Medical Center complex comprises the Alfred and Norma Lerner Tower, Samuel Mather Pavilion, Lakeside Hospital, Rainbow Babies & Children's Hospital, MacDonald Women's Hospital, Seidman Cancer Center, and Hanna Pavilion. In addition to the main campus, UH provides medical services at 11 regional hospitals throughout Northeast Ohio.

Main Campus
 UH Cleveland Medical Center
 UH Rainbow Babies & Children's Hospital ("Rainbow")
 UH Seidman Cancer Center ("Seidman")
 UH MacDonald Women's Hospital ("Mac House")

Regional Hospitals
 UH Ahuja Medical Center - Beachwood, OH
 UH Bedford Medical Center - Bedford, OH
 UH Conneaut Medical Center - Conneaut, OH
 UH Elyria Medical Center - Elyria, OH
 UH Geauga Medical Center - Chardon, OH
 UH Geneva Medical Center - Geneva, OH
 UH Parma Medical Center - Parma, OH
 UH Portage Medical Center - Ravenna, OH
 UH Richmond Medical Center - Richmond Heights, OH
 UH Samaritan Medical Center - Ashland, OH
 UH St. John Medical Center - Westlake, OH

On April 16, 2021, University Hospitals acquired nearby Lake Health, which operates 10+ facilities.

Rankings
 UH Cleveland Medical Center is ranked in the top 25 nationally in Ear, Nose & Throat; Gastroenterology & GI Surgery, Gynecology; Nephrology; and Neurology & Neurosurgery.
Rainbow Babies & Children's Hospital, is ranked #6 nationally for Neonatal Care by the U.S. News & World Report.
Among UH Rainbow pediatric specialties, Neonatology, Pulmonology, Diabetes & Endocrinology, Orthopedics, Cancer, and Urology are ranked among the top 25 in the nation.
 Cleveland Medical Center and Case School of Medicine together form the largest biomedical research center in Ohio.
 In biomedical research, Case Medical Center ranks among top 15 centers in the United States with approximately $75 million in annual extramural research funding and a further $20 million in various clinical trials.
 University Hospitals Cleveland Medical Center also includes MacDonald Women's Hospital, Ohio's only hospital for women; and Seidman Cancer Center (formerly known as Ireland Cancer Center).

Vision 2010

Vision 2010 was the largest construction and upgrade project in the history of University Hospitals. New construction included a new 200-bed cancer hospital (UH Seidman cancer center), upgraded emergency room facilities at CMC, a new neonatal intensive care unit (NICU) at Rainbow Babies & Children's Hospital, and new construction at other hospital sites. The capital expenditure for this project, according to hospital press releases, was to be approximately US$1 billion. Construction was originally due to be completed by the year 2010, but was not scheduled completed until 2011.

Harrington Project
The Harrington Project for Discovery & Development, launched in 2012, is a $300 million initiative at the University Hospitals whose purpose is to speed the delivery of new drugs and enhance the medical reputations of Cleveland and the Hospitals. It was established through a $50 million gift from the Harrington family and an additional $100 million in support from University Hospitals. The project has three components,  the Harrington Discovery Institute (HDI), the Innovation Support Center (ISC), and Biomotiv.

In June 2014, the Harrington Discovery Institute received a $25 million grant from the State of Ohio through the Third Frontier economic development program to further its mission.

Notable alumni and faculty
 George Washington Crile (1910-1924 Chair of Surgery) - Performed first blood transfusion. Established Lakeside Hospital of University Hospitals Case Medical Center, and later co-founded Cleveland Clinic
 Claude Beck (Surgery residency alum; 1924 -1971 Professor of Cardiovascular Surgery - first such position in US)
 Performed first surgical treatment of coronary artery disease (1935).
 Performed first defibrillation using machine he built with James Rand (1947)
 Developed concept of Beck's Triad
 Started the first CPR teaching course for medical professionals (1950).
 Peter C. Agre (1978 Internal Medicine alumnus) - co-recipient 2003 Nobel Prize in Chemistry for discoveries that have clarified how salts and water are transported out of and into the cells of the body, leading to a better understanding of many diseases of the kidneys, heart, muscles and nervous system.
 Alfredo Palacio (Internal Medicine alumnus) - President of Ecuador (2005–2007)
 Peter Pronovost - intensive care physician known globally for his work on patient safety

In popular culture
 In 2015, the cable network NatGeo broadcast Brain Surgery Live from UH Cleveland Medical Center, the first brain surgery ever televised live in the United States.
In 2017, Roger Daltrey of The Who visited cancer patients at the Angie Fowler Adolescent and Young Adult Cancer Institute at UH Rainbow Babies & Children's Hospital, part of University Hospitals.
 In 2018, the nationally syndicated program The Doctors featured an in-utero cardiac procedure performed at University Hospitals.

Controversy 
University Hospitals faces multiple lawsuits following an incident in March 2018 at its Fertility Center that compromised 4,000+ eggs and embryos stored in liquid nitrogen as the result of an unexpected temperature fluctuation with a tissue cryo storage tank.

In 2021, amid the COVID-19 pandemic, the University Hospitals permitted its careworkers to be unvaccinated against COVID.

See also
Rainbow Babies & Children's Hospital
Case Western Reserve University School of Medicine
Cleveland Clinic
Medical centers in the United States

References

External links
University Hospitals Cleveland Medical Center

Hospitals in Cleveland
University Circle
Teaching hospitals in Ohio
Case Western Reserve University
Level 1 trauma centers
Trauma centers